Vernonia Municipal Airport  is a city-owned, public-use airport located two nautical miles (3.7 km) west of the central business district of Vernonia, a city in Columbia County, Oregon, United States.

Facilities and aircraft 
It has one runway designated 9/27 with a turf surface measuring 2,940 by 45 feet (896 x 14 m).

For the 12-month period ending February 12, 2007, the airport had 3,000 general aviation aircraft operations, an average of 250 per month. At that time there were 5 aircraft based at this airport, all single-engine.

References

External links 
 Aerial image as of 30 July 2000 from USGS The National Map
 

Airports in Columbia County, Oregon